This is a  list of buildings in Ringsted Municipality, Denmark.

The list

4100 Ringsted

4174 Jystrup Midtsj

See also
 List of churches in Ringsted Municipality

References

External links

 Danish Agency of Culture Ref

 
Ringsted